Larry Tsutomu Yaji (May 10, 1926 – December 30, 2013) was a professional baseball infielder who played for the Nishitetsu Lions in the Japanese Pacific League in 1952. He batted .224 with a .302 on-base percentage, .304 slugging percentage and 28 hits in 55 games.

He was born on Honolulu, Hawaii and died at the age of 87 in Wahiawa, Hawaii. He attended Farrington High School.

References

1926 births
2013 deaths
Nishitetsu Lions players
Baseball players from Hawaii
American baseball players of Japanese descent